The Battle of Kirbekan was a battle in the Mahdist War. It was fought February 10, 1885, when the British Nile Column, about 1,000 strong, under General Earle, stormed the heights of Kirbekan, which were held by a strong Mahdist force, and totally routed them, with heavy loss.

Background 
The British lost 60, among whom was General William Earle, killed. It was the first appearance of the Egyptian Army Camel Corps under Bimbashi Marriott in action. A brass plaque on the North wall of Lichfield Cathedral commemorates the death of Lieutenant colonel Philip Eyre of the First South Staffordshire Regiment in the battle.

Forces 
The British forces involved in the battle were:

 Squadron from 19th Hussars
 1st Battalion, South Staffordshire Regiment
 1st Battalion, The Black Watch (Royal Highlanders)
 D Company, 1st Battalion, Gordon Highlanders
 45 Boatmen from Canada

References 

1885 in Sudan
Conflicts in 1885
Battles of the Mahdist War
February 1885 events